Ooni Ojelokunbirin was the 24th Ooni of Ife, a paramount traditional ruler of Ile Ife, the ancestral home of the Yorubas. He succeeded Ooni Agbedegbede and was succeeded by  
Ooni Lagunja.

References

Oonis of Ife
Yoruba history